C.L.I.F. 2 (Courage, Loyalty, Integrity, Fairness, or 警徽天职2) was a police procedural series produced by MediaCorp Singapore in 2012 in collaboration with the Singapore Police Force. It was broadcast from 18 February to 15 March 2013 on free-to-air MediaCorp Channel 8 and consists of 20 episodes. The series is co-sponsored by Gain City, Sheng Siong Supermarkets and Gold Roast Coffee. It stars Li Nanxing, Qi Yuwu, Rui En, Joanne Peh and Thomas Ong for the second installment of the series.

The series is the highest-rated drama serial in 2013, with an average viewership of 901,000, beating the record set by It's a Wonderful Life (with 835,000).

A sequel for the drama, C.L.I.F. 3, will air April 9, 2014. Elvin Ng will return to act in the drama series.

Background
C.L.I.F. 警徽天职 was the 2nd most watched drama for 2011 with an average viewership of 924,000. The final episode attracted over 1,041,000 viewers. It also had 47,844 streams per episode, the highest average number of streams per episode on MediaCorp's Catch-Up TV portal on Xinmsn.

The series was also praised for the departure away from an idealised depiction of police officers and its realistic portrayal of the unseen struggles and obstacles police officers often face. In response, MediaCorp commissioned a second season, again in collaboration with the SPF, and filming began at the end of September. Most of the main cast is retained. Prior to filming, it was confirmed that Tay Ping Hui and Tracy Lee will not be returning and Rui En, Pierre Png and Li Nanxing will join the cast. C.L.I.F. 2 is made its debut on 18 February 2013.

Synopsis
The series continues from where C.L.I.F. left off with new cases and new cast members. Yew Jia (Qi Yuwu) is now a Senior Investigating Officer and has begun a relationship with Xin Yi (Joanne Peh), who had partnered with him in the CID on a temporary transfer. Former uniformed officer Kok Hung (Andie Chen) was recently transferred to the Special Investigations Section in the CID. Seetoh Yan (Aileen Tan) remains in charge but is assigned as Head Investigation Officer as well.

Yew Jia is assigned a new partner Jimmy (Cavin Soh), a veteran policeman, and their friendship begins awkwardly when Jimmy accidentally mistook Yew Jia for a molester and "arrests" him. Kok Hung's follow-the-book approach does not bode well with his partners as he has to learn to adjust to a different way of approaching cases than he was used to during his days on uniformed patrol at a NPC. His superior is Tze Keat (Rui En), a headstrong career woman who has yet to find her other half. When her long-time colleague and forensics expert Lim Thiam (Li Nanxing) challenges her to meet someone through a speed-dating event, not wanting to lose the wager, she accepts. Xin Yi's dream comes true when she earns a transfer to the CID and assigned to the Serious Sexual Crimes Branch. She meets the resident medical examiner Dr Chow (Thomas Ong) and becomes torn between him and Yew Jia.

The officers from the different branches at Tanglin Police Division work together to tackle all sorts of cases ranging from misdemeanours such as theft to more major cases such as violent crime, elaborate scams and prostitution. Unfortunately for some, their personal lives interfere with their jobs and they are forced to make difficult decisions. Kok Hung is grief-stricken when his fiancée is murdered and struggles to keep his emotions in check. Seetoh Yan gets a shock of her life when her usually mild-mannered son becomes a suspect in separate rape and assault cases. Xin Yi becomes worried her sister Jen is hanging out with the wrong crowd when Jen becomes a suspect in one of Yew Jia's cases. Keat's memory of her own sister's disappearance and murder returns to haunt her during a series of kidnapping-cum-murder investigations and the similarities in modus operandi leads her to suspect the same perpetrator has returned. Meanwhile, a dashing young psychologist Chan Yin Kwun (Pierre Png) Tze Keat and Lum Thiam befriend is not all he seems.

Cast
The characters names are in both Chinese and dialect (if any) romanization.

Main cast

Supporting police cast

Other cast

Cameo appearances

Trivia
 Crime-prevention tips are shared during the ending credits of each episode. This is the third series where News Tonight commentaries are not announced.
 Incidentally, Li Nanxing and Pierre Png also had scenes together in Beyond.
 Shaun Chen, Chen Hanwei and Yao Wenlong are seen watching the scene where Rui En marries Li Nanxing (episode 20) in episode 13 of Blessings.
Pierre Png's second villainous role after The Journey: A Voyage.
 Chen Hanwei and Yao Wenlong can be seen watching the series in episode 20 of Blessings, as Shaun Chen prepares to leave the house.

References to other dramas
 The first episode featured a short clip from Crime Busters x 2 (2008) where Zhijie and Lantian were discussing about how crime serials were produced according to the way the TV station wants to direct. Tay Ping Hui, who was also in the first season, was also seen during the credits reel on TV.
 The TV serial Together (2009), which Chia Mien Yang was also the executive producer, was shown briefly in episode 3, and in episode 6 where Guohuang and Ailin test out the 3D TVs in a Gain City outlet. Wang Yuqing, who would be in the third season, was also seen on the TVs.

Episodes

Awards & Nominations

Star Awards 2014
C.L.I.F. 2 won one award in the Asian Television Awards. Pierre Png won the Best Actor in a Supporting Role "Highly Commended" award. It also clinched 1 out of 5 awards for the Star Awards, the Top Rated Drama Serial in 2013.The other dramas nominated for Best Drama Series are The Journey: A Voyage , The Dream Makers , Beyond & 96°C Café

Asian Television Award 2013

See also
 When Duty Calls

References

Singapore Chinese dramas
2013 Singaporean television series debuts
2013 Singaporean television series endings
Singapore Police Force
Police procedural television series
Singaporean crime television series
2013 Singaporean television seasons
Channel 8 (Singapore) original programming
C.L.I.F.